William Gibson McIntyre (29 July 1897 – 3 March 1971) was an Australian rules footballer who played with Melbourne and Footscray in the Victorian Football League (VFL).

Notes

External links 

1897 births
1971 deaths
Australian rules footballers from Melbourne
Melbourne Football Club players
Footscray Football Club (VFA) players
Western Bulldogs players
People from Malvern, Victoria